Most lakes of Serbia are artificial, created by damming numerous rivers of Serbia for the purpose of obtaining hydroelectric power or as water reservoirs. Natural lakes in the Pannonian Plain are shallow, occurred as river arms or bogs, or by aeolian erosion. Few natural lakes in the mountains are of glacial origin.

List of lakes
The list of lakes of Serbia, excluding the territory of Kosovo.

Note: in Serbian, word for lake (jezero) is almost always a part of the lake's name. If the name is given as a noun, jezero precedes it (Jezero Gazivode), if the name is given as an adjective (usually with the -ko suffix), jezero comes after (Vlasinsko jezero).

See also

 List of rivers of Serbia
 List of mountains of Serbia

References

Serbia
Lakes